George Frederick Bodley  (14 March 182721 October 1907) was an English Gothic Revival architect. He was a pupil of Sir George Gilbert Scott, and worked in partnership with Thomas Garner for much of his career. He was one of the founders of Watts & Co.

Personal life
Bodley was the youngest son of William Hulme Bodley, M.D., of Edinburgh, physician at Hull Royal Infirmary, Hull, who in 1838 retired to his wife's home town, Brighton, Sussex, England. George's eldest brother, the Rev. W.H. Bodley, became a well-known Roman Catholic preacher and a professor at St Mary's College, New Oscott, Birmingham.

He married Minna F.H. Reavely, daughter of Thomas George Wood Reavely, at Kinnersley Castle in 1872. They had a son, George H. Bodley, born in 1874.

Career

Bodley was articled to the architect Sir George Gilbert Scott, a relative by marriage, under whose influence he became imbued with the spirit of the Gothic revival, and he became known as the chief exponent of 14th-century English Gothic, and the leading ecclesiastical architect in England. He is regarded as the leader of the resurgence of interest in English and Northern European late-medieval design. Noted for his pioneering design work in the Queen Anne revival,

Bodley became acquainted with William Morris in the late 1850s, and in the 1860s his commissions for stained glass and ecclesiastical decoration helped ensure the success of Morris's firm, Morris, Marshall, Faulkner & Co., founded in 1861. Bodley is said to have designed two of Morris's early wallpapers. By the late 1860s Bodley had become disenchanted with Morris, and for stained glass turned to the firm of Burlison and Grylls, founded in 1868, for the glass in his later churches, notably St Augustine's Church, Pendlebury, near Manchester (designed 1870) and the Church of the Holy Angels, Hoar Cross in Staffordshire (designed 1871–72). Bodley worked with his lifelong friend, the stained glass designer Charles Eamer Kempe. They collaborated on projects including: St John the Baptist, Tuebrook in Liverpool; Queens' College Chapel, Cambridge; All Saints, Danehill, East Sussex and the Church of St Mary the Virgin, Clumber Park in Nottinghamshire. His alterations to St Stephen's Church, Gloucester Road, London, the architect and president of RIBA, Harry Stuart Goodhart-Rendel said tamed the work of its founding 'rogue' Victorian architect, Joseph Peacock.

Partnership with Thomas Garner
From 1869 he worked in a twenty-eight-year partnership with Thomas Garner, designing collegiate buildings in Oxford and Cambridge, country houses and churches throughout the British Isles. One cathedral was completed to his design: St David's Cathedral, Hobart in Tasmania, Australia (first design, 1865; revised 1891; building completed 1936). In 1906 Bodley designed with his pupil Henry Vaughan the Washington National Cathedral in Washington, D.C. He also provided a design for Grace Cathedral, San Francisco, but it was not used.

As well as Vaughan, Bodley and Garner's pupils included the garden designer Inigo Thomas who specialised in formal gardens with geometrical plans in 17th- and 18th-century styles, which suited the houses that Bodley and Garner renovated for wealthy clients.

In 1874 Bodley founded Watts & Co. with Garner and George Gilbert Scott Jr. Bodley, Garner, and Scott all lived on Church Row in Hampstead in the 1860s and 70s.

His secular work included the London School Board offices, and in collaboration with Garner, the new buildings at Magdalen College, Oxford, and Hewell Grange, Worcestershire (for Lord Windsor).

Liverpool Cathedral competition
In 1902 Bodley was an assessor for the competition to design Liverpool Cathedral which selected a design by the young Giles Gilbert Scott. When construction of the cathedral began in 1904, Bodley was appointed to oversee Gilbert Scott's work, but had no direct part in its design.

Late works
One of Bodley's final architectural works was the chapel at Bedford School, the foundation stone of which was laid on 18 May 1907 by Lord St John of Bletso. Building took a year, the chapel was consecrated in July 1908, but by which time Bodley had died. The other was the St Chad's parish church, Burton upon Trent. Work started in 1905 and the church was consecrated in 1910. After Bodley's death his partner Cecil Greenwood Hare took over the project; his contribution was the design of an octagonal choir vestry.

Royal Academy
Bodley exhibited at the Royal Academy from 1854. He was elected an associate of the academy in 1881 and a full academician in 1902.

Other activities
As well as being an architect, he was a draughtsman, a connoisseur of art, published a volume of poems in 1899, inspired art works by painters such as John Melhuish Strudwick and designed wallpaper and chintzes for Watts & Co. He served as prime warden of the Fishmongers' Company in 1901–02. In early life he had been in close alliance with the Pre-Raphaelites, and he did a great deal to improve public taste in domestic decoration and furniture.

Death
Bodley died on 21 October 1907 at Water Eaton, Oxfordshire and is buried in the churchyard of the Church of St James, Kinnersley, Herefordshire.

Gallery

Works

New churches

Church repairs, alterations and furnishings
 1859–63 St James' Church, Bicknor, Kent: new vestry, porch and roof, reseating and repairs to walls
 1863–65 All Saints' Church, Coddington, Nottinghamshire: rebuild
 1864–65 St James' Church, Wigmore, Herefordshire: repairs
1864–67 Jesus College Chapel, Cambridge: repairs
 1866–69 St Michael & All Angels Church, Kingsland, Herefordshire: repairs
 1868–70 St Mary's Church, Almeley, Herefordshire, with Thomas Garner: repairs
 1868–70 St Nicholas's Church, South Kilworth, Leicestershire: repairs
 1870–71 St Mary the Virgin, Barnsley, Yorkshire: repairs
 1870–73 St Michael's Church, Lyonshall, Herefordshire: repairs
 1871–72 St Mark's Church, Bilton, Warwickshire, with Thomas Garner: new north aisle, transept and organ chamber, with reseating, reflooring and general repairs to roofs and walls
 1871–72 Church of St Mary Magdalene, Keyworth, Nottinghamshire: repairs
 1871–72 St Laurence's Church, Rowington, Warwickshire, with Thomas Garner: repairs
 1873 St Swithun's Church, East Retford Nottinghamshire: Chantry chapel rebuilt
 1873–75 Church of St Mary the Virgin, Plumtree, Nottinghamshire, with Thomas Garner: decoration and new organ case
 1873–79 St Michael's Church, Shalbourne, Berkshire, with Thomas Garner, new south aisle: reseating and general restoration
 1874 St Helen's Church, Brant Broughton, Lincolnshire: new chancel and repairs
 1874–78 St Peter & St Paul's Church, Langham, Rutland, with Thomas Garner: repairs to roof, walls, tower and belfry
 1876–79 St Laurence's Church, Oxhill, Warwickshire, with Thomas Garner: repairs
 1876–88 St Wilfrid's Church, Hickleton, Yorkshire
 1880 St Swithun's Church, Leonard Stanley, Gloucestershire
 1880–83 St Laurence's Church, Frodsham, with Thomas Garner: restoration
 1881–84 All Saints' Church, Nettleham, Lincolnshire, with Thomas Garner: new vestry and organ chamber, rebuilding and enlargement of chancel, rebuilding of porch and general repairs
 1882–90 All Saints' Church, Bedworth, Warwickshire, with Thomas Garner: rebuild
 1884 St Mary's Church, Clifton, Nottinghamshire
 1885 St Michael's Church, Kirk Langley, Derbyshire, with Thomas Garner: restoration
 1886–88 St Manakneu's Church, Lanreath, Cornwall, with Thomas Garner: repairs
 1887 Church of St Giles, Wimborne St Giles, Dorset, remodelling in the Gothic style 
 1889–91 St Giles' Church, Mountnessing, Essex, with Thomas Garner: new vestry/organ chamber, four new nave windows, reseating and general repairs to roof and walls
 1889–92 St John the Baptist Church, Epping, Essex, with Thomas Garner: rebuild
 1890 St John the Divine, Kennington, London (interior)
 1890 St Mary's Church, Nottingham (chapter house)
 1890 St Saviour's Church, Ellerby Road, Leeds: addition of Pusey chapel.
 1890–99 St Andrew's Church, Chelmondiston, Suffolk, with Thomas Garner: enlargement
 1891–1905 All Saints' Church, St Paul's Walden, Hertfordshire, with Thomas Garner: new vestry, new west window in south aisle, reseating and general repairs to roof and walls
 1892 Holy Trinity Church, Markbeech, Kent: new chancel
 1892 St Paul's Church, Knightsbridge: new chancel, rood screen and reredos
 1895 St Martin's Church, Womersley, Yorkshire: rood screen and loft, nave and chancel roof decoration
 1897 St George in the Meadows, Nottingham: added chancel
 1898 St Bartholomew's Church, Wilmslow: clerestory added to chancel
 1898–1903 Holy Trinity Church, Long Melford: refurbishment of main tower
 1898–1905 St Bartholomew's Church, Reading, Berkshire: new chancel, north chapel, vestry and chapel at east end of south aisle
 1898–1905 St Paul's Church, Bedford: reorder chancel, restore choir stalls and new rood screen
 1899–1901 All Saints' Church, East Horndon, Essex: repairs
 1899–1904 St Carantoc's Church, Crantock, Cornwall, with Edmund Harold Sedding: repairs
 1900–01 St Nicholas' Church, Little Bowden, Northamptonshire: repairs
 1901 St Peter's Church, Hartshorne, Derbyshire: enlargement
 1901 St Mary's Church, Whitkirk, Leeds: rebuilt
 1902–05 St Mary the Virgin, Barton Mills, Suffolk: repairs
 1903 St Stephen's, Gloucester Road, London, with Walter Tapper: new reredos and other alterations
 1903–04 Christ Church, Mold Green, Kirkheaton, Yorkshire: new chancel, vestry & organ chamber
 1904 St Bartholomew's Church, Elvaston repairs and rebuilding of the chancel
 1905–07 St Nicholas' Church, Skirbeck, Lincolnshire: new vestries, organ chamber and porches, several new windows, rebuilding of chancel, reseating and general repairs
 1906 Church of the Annunciation to the Blessed Virgin Mary, Souldern: dismantled and rebuilt bell tower and tower arch
 1906 Holy Angels Church, Lilliput Road, Poole, Dorset: rood screen, choir stalls and organ case
 1906 St Barnabas Church, Pimlico, London: reredos, rood screen and (with Hill and Son) organ case
 1907 St Barnabas Church, Hove: reredos
 1907–09 All Saints' Church, Kedleston: north aisle
St Paul's, Burton upon Trent: alterations

Secular buildings
 1870 Queens' College Old Hall, Cambridge, decoration
 1872–76 Offices of the London School Board (with Thomas Garner), (demolished 1929)
 The Wodehouse near Wombourne, for the Shaw-Hellier family
 Hewell Grange
 1905: Second Boer War Memorial, York

References

Sources

External links
 Profile on Royal Academy of Arts Collections

1827 births
1907 deaths
19th-century English architects
Gothic Revival architects
English ecclesiastical architects
Recipients of the Royal Gold Medal
Architects of cathedrals
Royal Academicians
Architects from Kingston upon Hull